Caledonian Sleeper is the collective name for overnight sleeper train services between London and Scotland, in the United Kingdom. It is one of only two currently operating sleeper services on the railway in the United Kingdom, the other being the Night Riviera which runs between London and Penzance.

A sleeper service has been run along the West Coast Main Line since 24 February 1873. Sleepers were historically run on the rival East Coast Main Line as well; however, all remaining sleeper services that ran on the east coast routes were withdrawn in May 1988. While InterCity continued to operate what would later become known as the Caledonian Sleeper, it decided to remove all seating accommodation on its remaining sleeper services during the mid-1990s. The Anglo-Scottish sleeper services were transferred to ScotRail on 5 March 1995; as a consequence of the privatisation of British Rail, on 31 March 1997, the service was privatised as a part of the wider ScotRail franchise, initially being operated by National Express. Seated Mark 2 carriages were re-added to the service alongside the Mark 3 sleeping cars, the latter were also refurbished, from January 2000.

On 17 October 2004, the ScotRail franchise and thus the Caledonian Sleeper, was transferred to FirstGroup. Since April 2015, the Caledonian Sleeper has been structured as a standalone franchise. It is operated by Serco and is under the supervision of the Scottish Government. As a part of its successful bid, Serco had pledged to invest £100million into the service, which was to be spent on, amongst other things, procuring new rolling stock. During 2019, a new fleet of Mark 5 carriages were introduced, replacing the British Rail-era carriages. These are hauled by a combination of  electric locomotives (on electrified sections only) and rebuilt  electro-diesel locomotives; prior traction withdrawn in 2019 included ,  and  locomotives.

Two services depart London Euston each night from Sunday to Friday and travel via the West Coast Main Line to Scotland. The earlier departure divides at Edinburgh into portions for Aberdeen, Fort William and Inverness. The later departure serves Edinburgh and Glasgow, splitting at Carstairs. Five London-bound portions depart from these destinations each night, combining into two trains at Edinburgh and Carstairs.

Serco's contract will end early in June 2023, and the service will be taken into public ownership by Transport Scotland.

Anglo-Scottish sleepers up to 1996
In February 1873, the North British Railway revealed the first sleeping car in Britain. It became the first sleeping carriage used on British railways when it made a revenue earning trip on 24 February 1873 attached to a train at Glasgow for King's Cross via the East Coast Main Line.

On 1 October 1873, the rival Caledonian Railway introduced a London and North Western Railway sleeping car on mail trains three days per week between Glasgow Buchanan Street and London Euston via the West Coast Main Line. The service ran from Glasgow on Tuesdays, Thursdays and Saturdays, and from London on Mondays, Wednesdays and Fridays. An extra charge of ten shillings was made for a sleeping berth.

Sleeping car services were operated on both the west and east coast routes to multiple destinations for over a century, even under the nationalised railway operator British Rail. However, sleeper services declined in number during the latter half of the 20th century. During November 1987, it was announced that the last of the sleeper services running on the East Coast routes was to be withdrawn in May 1988.

At one point, InterCity was planning to remove all seating accommodation on its remaining sleeper services from May 1992. However, it instead concluded a deal with the British transport conglomerate Stagecoach that saw the Mark 2 seating carriages retailed beyond this point. This was only a temporary reprieve however, as the Stagecoach carriages were withdrawn after 12 months.

On 5 March 1995, responsibility for operation of the Anglo-Scottish services was transferred within British Rail from InterCity West Coast to ScotRail. During the mid-1990s, British Rail had proposed to cease operating the  portion of the service, however, the Highland Regional Council successfully sought a stay pending a formal consultation, after the Scottish Court of Session ruled that the correct service closure process had not been followed. Eventually, British Rail agreed to retain the Fort William portion, albeit with a reduction four sleeping carriages to only one. During 1995, the associated motorail service was withdrawn without reprieve.

The Caledonian Sleeper

ScotRail
On 4 June 1996, the overnight service was relaunched under the Caledonian Sleeper brand. Each portion of the service was assigned its own identity, with the Night Caledonian to Glasgow, Night Scotsman to Edinburgh, Night Aberdonian to Aberdeen, Royal Highlander to Inverness and West Highlander to Fort William. On 31 March 1997, it became part of the ScotRail franchise which was initially operated by National Express. The service continued to be operated using the same Mark 3 sleeping cars that had been operated by British Rail, but there were no suitable locomotives immediately available. Accordingly, the short-term hiring of locomotives from the West Coast operator Virgin Trains was implemented. The arrangement continued until March 1998, at which point the freight operator English, Welsh and Scottish Railway (EWS) took on the contract.

Starting in January 2000, seated carriages were added to the sleeping cars; these were 11 former Virgin Trains Mark 2 carriages that had been refurbished at Wolverton Works, which included the installation of first class-style reclining seats throughout. In parallel with this work, the sleeping cars were also refurbished, during which time they were repainted with ScotRail's purple and blue livery.

On 17 October 2004, the ScotRail franchise, including the Caledonian Sleeper service, was transferred to FirstGroup. In spite of this transfer, both the rolling stock and locomotive contracts remained fundamentally unchanged, except for the carriages and three of EWS's  locomotives being repainted in FirstGroup's corporate blue, pink and white livery.

Serco
During 2012, the Scottish Government announced that as part of the reletting of the ScotRail franchise from April 2015, the Caledonian Sleeper would be operated by a separate franchise. In June 2013, Transport Scotland announced Arriva, FirstGroup and Serco had been shortlisted to bid for the new franchise. During May 2014, the franchise was awarded to Serco; at the time, the company pledged to invest £100million in new trains that would include 'en suite' rooms and a new style of club car. Accordingly, the existing Mark 2 and Mark 3 coaching stock was to be replaced, originally set to occur by 2018. On 31 March 2015, Serco Caledonian Sleepers took over the operation of the service.

In late December 2015, staff called for a two-day strike because of health and safety concerns with the trains then in use and Serco's alleged failure to address them appropriately. In September 2019, another three-day strike was held after negotiations between the RMT and Serco broke down over claims of poor staffing levels and insufficient training.

By mid-2020, the Caledonian Sleeper had considerably curtailed its services in response to the significant decline of passenger travel amid the COVID-19 pandemic. From 15 June 2020, both passengers and staff on public transport in England, including on board the Caledonian Sleeper, were required to wear face coverings while travelling; anyone failing to do so was liable to be refused travel or fined.

In late 2021, the Caledonian Sleeper was subject to further strikes over allegations of bullying and harassment of staff. It is also one of many train operators impacted by the 2022–2023 United Kingdom railway strikes, which are the first national rail strikes in the UK for three decades. Its workers are amongst those are participating in industrial action due to a dispute over pay and working conditions. Caledonian Sleeper trains have been cancelled on the days of the strikes.

In October 2022, the Scottish Government announced the franchise run by Serco would end on 25 June 2023. On 2 March 2023, the Scottish government announced the seven-year-early termination of Serco's contract. They announced that the service would transfer on 25 June to Scottish Rail Holdings, 
the operator of last resort for Transport Scotland.

Current operations

Two trains are operated on six days each week (not Saturday night/Sunday morning).

Trains use the West Coast Main Line between Scotland and London, using  as their terminus. Sunday services are sometimes diverted via the East Coast Main Line when the West Coast route is closed for engineering work. In these cases, they still use London Euston except when the station itself is closed, or there is no possible routing into the station during engineering works, in which case they use nearby  instead.

Highland Sleeper

This leg of the journey is formed of 16 carriages and is hauled by an electric  locomotive.

The electric locomotive is uncoupled and replaced by a  diesel locomotive for each of the three northbound sets. The front portion of the train continues to Fort William, the middle portion is for Aberdeen, and the rear portion runs to Inverness. These services arrive at their respective destinations in the morning of the next day.

Similarly, going southbound, three separate services depart each of Aberdeen, Inverness and Fort William in the evening, hauled by a  locomotive up to Edinburgh. The train continues to London Euston with intermediate stops at Preston and Crewe for alighting passengers only (southbound trains do not call at Watford Junction), arriving in London the following morning.

The Inverness portion of the train consists of six sleeper coaches, one seated carriage and one "club car" (lounge car), all running through to/from London. The Aberdeen set consists of between two and four sleeper coaches (depending on demand) plus one seated carriage and one lounge car, all running throughout. The Fort William set consists only of two to four sleeper coaches between London and Edinburgh; the seated and lounge carriages are attached/detached at Edinburgh Waverley for the EdinburghFort William leg of the journey. This means that any seated passengers travelling between England and stations on the Fort William route are required to use the seated carriages intended for Inverness or Aberdeen, and change carriages at Edinburgh Waverley.

Lowland Sleeper
The train then continues with no intermediate calls until  before reaching . Carlisle, Carstairs and Motherwell are all served for alighting passengers only.

Similarly, in the southbound direction, two separate services depart both Glasgow Central (calling at Motherwell) and Edinburgh Waverley, and combine into one at Carstairs. The train then calls at Carlisle, before running non-stop through to Watford Junction (served for alighting passengers only) and terminating at London Euston the next morning. Motherwell, Carstairs and Carlisle are all served to pick up passengers only.

Rolling stock

The ScotRail franchise inherited the coaches used by British Rail; Mark 3 sleeping coaches and Mark 2 seated carriages, some of which were fitted out as lounge cars where refreshments could be obtained. During 2019, these were replaced by Mark 5 carriages; the new rolling stock was first operated on the Lowland services from April, and subsequently on the Highland services from October. Heavy maintenance on the carriage stock was performed at Inverness TMD until April 2015, when the work was contracted out to Alstom and transferred to Polmadie Traction and Rolling Stock Maintenance Depot.

Two types of motive power are used for the Caledonian Sleeper. On the electrified routes between Glasgow/Edinburgh and London electric locomotives haul the trains. There were none of these included in the ScotRail franchises, instead they contracted Virgin Trains to provide . In March 1998, these were replaced by English, Welsh and Scottish Railway (EWS) .

, Serco has a contract with GB Railfreight who use . However, due to mechanical problems, a Class 90 locomotive was used, initially hired from DB Cargo UK, but later changed to Freightliner.

The Class 67 units were also used on the Fort William route from June 2006. When GB Railfreight started to provide the trains and crews for the Serco franchise in 2015, it was planned to use rebuilt . The first of these came into service in February 2016.

Current fleet

Past fleet
Former train types operated by Caledonian Sleeper include:

Incidents 
During April 2019, new Mark 5 carriages were introduced to service, however, the inaugural journey was more than three hours late arriving at London Euston. Various other services through 2019 were reported as delayed on account of "technical faults".

Services run joined between London and Scotland where they are split into shorter trains to serve multiple destinations. The incident was investigated by the Rail Accident Investigation Branch with two recommendations. One was addressed to the Rail Safety and Standards Board to change the wording of the railway rule book to make it clear that the brake continuity test should be undertaken after all coupling-related activities have been completed. The second was addressed to Caledonian Sleeper to review the vulnerability of the isolating cocks on its rolling stock, to prevent inadvertent operation by persons or objects.

Notes

References

External links

 

Named passenger trains of British Rail
Night trains of the United Kingdom
Railway franchises in the United Kingdom
Railway services introduced in 1996
Rail transport in Scotland
Serco
Transport in Aberdeen
Transport in Dundee
Transport in Edinburgh
Transport in Glasgow
Transport in Highland (council area)
1996 establishments in the United Kingdom
Companies of Scotland